The 2022–23 Women's EHF Champions League group stage was played between 10 September 2022 and 12 February 2023 to determine the twelve teams advancing to the knockout stage of the 2022–23 Women's EHF Champions League.

Draw
The draw was held on 1 July 2022 in Vienna, Austria.

Seeding
The composition of the seeding pots for the group stage draw was announced on 28 June 2022. From each pot, two teams were drawn into Group A and the other two in Group B. Teams from the same national association could not be drawn into the same group.

Format
In each group, teams played against each other in a double round-robin format, with home and away matches.

Tiebreakers
In the group stage, teams were ranked according to points (2 points for a win, 1 point for a draw, 0 points for a loss). After completion of the group stage, if two or more teams had the same number of points, the ranking is determined as follows:

Highest number of points in matches between the teams directly involved;
Superior goal difference in matches between the teams directly involved;
Highest number of goals scored in matches between the teams directly involved;
Superior goal difference in all matches of the group;
Highest number of plus goals in all matches of the group;
If the ranking of one of these teams is determined, the above criteria are consecutively followed until the ranking of all teams is determined. If no ranking can be determined, a decision shall be obtained by EHF through drawing of lots.

Groups
The matchdays were 10–11 September, 17–18 September, 24–25 September, 8–9 October, 15–16 October, 22–23 October, 3–4 December, 10–11 December, 17–18 December 2022, 7–8 January, 14–15 January, 21–22 January, 4–5 February and 11–12 February 2023.

Times until 29 October 2022 are UTC+2, from 30 October 2022 on UTC+1.

Group A

Group B

Notes

References

External links
Official website

Group stage